In ancient Rome, the Vestal Virgins or Vestals (singular  ) were priestesses of Vesta, virgin goddess of Rome's sacred hearth and its flame.

The Vestals were unlike any other public priesthood. They were chosen before puberty from a number of suitable candidates, freed from any legal ties and obligations to their birth family, and enrolled in Vesta's priestly college of six priestesses.

Vesta's acolytes vowed to serve her for at least thirty years, to study and practise her rites in service of the Roman State, and to maintain their chastity throughout. As well as their obligations on behalf of Rome, Vestals had extraordinary rights and privileges, some of which were granted to no others, male or female.

The Vestals took it in turns to supervise Vesta's hearth, so that at least one Vestal was stationed there at all times. Vestals who allowed the sacred fire to go out were punished with whipping. Their sexual partners, if known, were publicly beaten to death. These were very rare events; most vestals retired with a generous pension and universal respect. They were then free to marry, though few of them did. Some appear to have renewed their vows.

In 382 AD, the Christian emperor Gratian confiscated the public revenues assigned to the cult of Vesta in Rome. The Vestals vanished from the historical record soon after.

History

Priesthoods with similar functions to the Vestals of Rome had an ancient and deeply embedded religious role in various surrounding Latin communities. According to Livy, the Vestals had pre-Roman origins at Alba Longa, where a virgin daughter of the king, forced by her usurper uncle to become a Vestal, miraculously gave birth to twin boys, Romulus and Remus. The twins were fathered by Mars; they survived their uncle's attempts to kill them through exposure or drowning, and Romulus went on to found Rome. In the most widely accepted versions of Rome's beginnings the city's  legendary second king, Numa Pompilius, built its first Temple of Vesta, appointed its first pair of Vestals and subsidised them as a collegiate priesthood. Rome's 6th King Servius Tullius, who was also said to have been miraculously fathered by the fire-god Vulcan or the household Lar on a captive Vestal, increased the number of Vestals to four. In the late 4th century AD, Ambrose claims that the college comprised seven vestals in his own day, but this is unlikely; in the Imperial era, six was usual.

The Vestals were a powerful and influential priesthood. Towards the end of the Republican era, when Sulla included the young Julius Caesar in his proscriptions, the Vestals interceded on Caesar's behalf and gained him pardon. Caesar's adopted heir, Augustus, promoted the Vestals' moral reputation and presence at public functions, and restored several of their customary privileges that had fallen into abeyance. They were held in awe, and attributed certain mysterious and supernatural powers and abilities. Pliny the Elder tacitly accepted these powers as fact:

The 4th-century AD urban prefect Symmachus, who sought to maintain traditional Roman religion during the rise of Christianity, wrote:

Dissolution of the Vestal College would have followed soon after the emperor Gratian confiscated its revenues in 382 AD. The last epigraphically attested Vestal is Coelia Concordia, a  who in 385 AD erected a statue to the deceased pontiff Vettius Agorius Praetextatus. The pagan historian Zosimos claims that when Theodosius I visited Rome in 394 AD, his niece Serena insulted an aged Vestal, said to be the last of her kind. It is not clear from Zosimos's narrative whether Vesta's cult was still functioning, maintained by that single Vestal, or moribund. Cameron is skeptical of the entire tale, noting that Theodosius did not visit Rome in 394.

Terms of service
The Vestals were committed to the priesthood before puberty (when 6–10 years old) and sworn to celibacy for a minimum period of 30 years. A thirty-year commitment was divided into three decade-long periods during which Vestals were respectively students, servants, and teachers.

Vestals typically retired with a state pension, in their late 30s to early 40s, and thereafter were free to marry. The , acting as the father of the bride, might arrange a marriage with a suitable Roman nobleman on behalf of the retired Vestal, but no literary accounts of such marriages have survived; Plutarch repeats a claim that "few have welcomed the indulgence, and that those who did so were not happy, but were a prey to repentance and dejection for the rest of their lives, thereby inspiring the rest with superstitious fears, so that until old age and death they remained steadfast in their virginity". Some Vestals preferred to renew their vows.

Selection 
To obtain entry into the order, a girl had to be free of physical, moral and mental defects, have two living parents and be a daughter of a free-born resident of Rome. From at least the mid-Republican era, the  chose Vestals by lot from a group of twenty high-born candidates at a gathering of their families and other Roman citizens.

Under the Papian Law of the 3rd century BCE, candidates for Vestal priesthoods had to be of patrician birth. Membership was opened to plebeians as it became difficult to find patricians willing to commit their daughters to 30 years as a Vestal, and then ultimately even from the daughters of freedmen for the same reason.

Once a girl was chosen to be a Vestal, the  pointed to her and led her away from her parents with the words, "I take you,  (beloved), to be a Vestal priestess, who will carry out sacred rites which it is the law for a Vestal priestess to perform on behalf of the Roman people, on the same terms as her who was a Vestal 'on the best terms (thus, with all the entitlements of a Vestal). As soon as she entered the atrium of Vesta's temple, she was under the goddess's service and protection.

If a Vestal died before her contracted term ended, potential replacements would be presented in the quarters of the chief Vestal, for the selection of the most virtuous. Unlike normal inductees, these candidates did not have to be prepubescent, nor even virgin; they could be young widows or even divorcees, though that was frowned upon and thought unlucky. Tacitus recounts how Gaius Fonteius Agrippa and Domitius Pollio offered their daughters as Vestal candidates in 19 AD to fill such a vacant position. Equally matched, Pollio's daughter was chosen only because Agrippa had been recently divorced. The  (Tiberius) "consoled" the failed candidate with a dowry of 1 million sesterces.

The chief Vestal was probably the most influential and independent of Rome's high priestesses, having commitment to the maintenance of several different cults, maintaining personal connections to her birth family and cultivating the society of her equals among the Roman elite. The  Occia presided over the Vestals for 57 years, according to Tacitus. The  and the  also held unique responsibility for certain religious rites, but each held office by virtue of their standing as the spouse of a male priest.

Duties and festivals 

Vestal tasks included the maintenance of their chastity, tending Vesta's sacred fire, guarding her sacred  (store-room) and its contents; collecting ritually pure water from a sacred spring; preparing substances used in public rites, presiding at the Vestalia and attending other festivals. Vesta's temple was essentially the temple of all Rome and its citizens; it was open all day, by night it was closed but only to men. The Vestals regularly swept and cleansed Vesta's shrine, functioning as surrogate housekeepers, in a religious sense, for all of Rome, and maintaining and controlling the connections between Rome's public and private religion. So long as their bodies remained unpenetrated, the walls of Rome would remain intact. Their flesh belonged to Rome, and when they died, whatever the cause of their death, their bodies remained within the city's boundary.

His influence and status grew during the Republican era, and the religious post became an important, lifetime adjunct to the political power of the annually elected consulship. When Augustus became , and thus supervisor of all religion, he donated his house to the Vestals. Their sacred fire became his household fire, and his domestic gods (Lares and Penates) became their responsibility. This arrangement between Vestals and Emperor persisted throughout the Imperial era.

The Vestals guarded various sacred objects kept in Vesta's , including the Palladium – a statue of Pallas Athene which had supposedly been brought from Troy – and a large, presumably wooden phallus, used in fertility rites and at least one triumphal procession, perhaps slung beneath the triumphal general's chariot.

Festivals 
Vesta's chief festival was the Vestalia, held in her temple from June 7 to June 15, and attended by matrons and bakers. Servius claims that during the Vestalia, the Lupercalia and on September 13, the three youngest Vestals reaped unripened  (spelt wheat, or possibly emmer wheat). The three senior Vestals parched the grain to make it edible, and mixed it with salt, to make the  used by priests and priestesses to consecrate (dedicate to the gods) the animal victims offered in public sacrifices. The Vestals' activities thus provided a shared link to various public, and possibly some private cults.

The Fordicidia was a characteristically rustic, agricultural festival, in which a pregnant cow was sacrificed to the Earth-goddess Tellus, and its unborn calf was reduced to ashes by the senior Vestal. The ashes were mixed with various substances, most notably the dried blood of the previous year's October horse, sacrificed to Mars. The mixture was called . During the Parilia festival, April 21, it was sprinkled on bonfires to purify shepherds and their flocks, and probably to ensure human and animal fertility in the Roman community. On May 1, Vestals officiated at Bona Dea's public-private, women-only rites at her Aventine temple. They were also present, in some capacity, at the Bona Dea's overnight, women-only December festival, hosted by the wife of Rome's senior magistrate; the magistrate himself was supposed to stay elsewhere for the occasion. On May 15, Vestals and pontifs collected ritual straw figures called Argei from stations along Rome's city boundary and cast them into the Tiber, to purify the city.

Privileges
Unlike any other Roman women, they could make a will of their own volition, and dispose of their property without sanction of a male guardian. They were allowed to give their property to women, something no man was allowed to do under Roman law. As they embodied the Roman state, Vestals could give evidence in trials without first taking the customary oath to the State. Their person was sacrosanct; anyone who assaulted a Vestal was, in effect, assaulting Rome and its gods, and could be killed with impunity. As no magistrate held power over the Vestals, the lictors of magistrates who encountered a Vestal had to lower their  in deference.

Otherwise, they seem to have been carried in a one-seat, curtained litter, or possibly went on foot. In every case, they were preceded by a lictor, who was empowered to enforce their right-of-way; anyone who passed beneath the litter, or otherwise interfered with its passage, could be lawfully killed on the spot.

Vestals could also free or pardon condemned persons en route to execution by touching them, or merely being seen by them, as long as the encounter had not been pre-arranged.

Vestals were permitted to see things forbidden to all other upperclass Roman women; from the time of Augustus on, they had reserved ring-side seating at public games, including gladiator contests, and stage-side seats at theatrical performances.

Prosecutions and punishments

If Vesta's fire went out, Rome was no longer protected; the fire could only be revived using the correct rituals and the purest materials. Expiation of prodigies usually involved a special sacrifice and the destruction of the "unnatural" object that had caused divine offence.

Extinction of the sacred fire through Vestal negligence could be expiated by the scourging or beating or the offender, carried out "in the dark and through a curtain to preserve their modesty". The sacred fire could then be relit. Loss of chastity, however, represented a broken oath. It was permanent, irreversible; no  or expiation could restore it or compensate its loss.

A Vestal who committed  breached Rome's contract with the gods; she was a contradiction, a visible religious embarrassment. By ancient tradition, she must die, but she must seem to do so willingly, and her blood could not be spilled. She would not technically be punished, but would vanish from sight yet remain in the city, and thus expiate her offence; she would not be interred, but instead descend into a "habitable room":

Confirmed cases of Vestal  are "extremely rare" in Roman history. Most took place during military or religious crisis. Some Vestals were probably used as scapegoats; their political alliances and alleged failure to observe oaths and duties were held to account for civil disturbances, wars, famines, plagues and other signs of divine displeasure. The end of Roman monarchy and the beginnings of the Republic involved extreme social tensions between Rome and her neighbours, and competition for power and influence between Rome's aristocrats and the commoner majority. In 483 BC, the Vestal Oppia was executed for  merely on the basis of various portents, and allegations that she neglected her Vestal duties. In 337 BC, Minucia, possibly the first plebeian Vestal, was tried, found guilty of inchastity and buried alive on the strength of her excessive and inappropriate love of dress, and the evidence of a slave. 

In 123 BC the gift of an altar, shrine and couch to the Bona Dea's Aventine temple by the Vestal Licinia "without the people's approval" was refused by the Roman Senate. The final accusations were justified by the death, in 114 BC, of Helvia, a virgin girl of equestrian family, killed by lightning while on horseback. The manner of her death was interpreted as a prodigy, proof of inchastity by the three accused. Aemilia, who had supposedly incited the two others to follow her example, was condemned outright and put to death. Marcia, who was accused of only one offence, and Licinia, who was accused of many, were at first acquitted by the pontifices, but were retried by Lucius Cassius Longinus Ravilla (consul 127), and condemned to death in 113. The prosecution offered two Sibylline prophecies in support of the final verdicts. The initial charges against the Vestals concerned were almost certainly trumped up, and may have been politically motivated.
 
Pliny the Younger believed that Cornelia, a  buried alive on the orders of emperor Domitian, may have been an innocent victim. He describes how she sought to keep her dignity intact when she descended into the chamber:

Dionysius of Halicarnassus claims that at ancient Alba Longa Vestals were whipped and "put to death" for breaking their vows of celibacy, and that their offspring were to be thrown into the river. According to Livy, Rhea Silvia, mother of Romulus and Remus, had been forced to become a Vestal Virgin, and was chained and imprisoned when she gave birth. Dionysius also writes that the Roman king Tarquinius Priscus instituted live burial as a punishment for Vestal inchastity, and inflicted it on the Vestal Pinaria; and that whipping with rods sometimes preceded the immuration, and that this was done to Urbinia in 471 BCE, in a time of pestilence and plebeian unrest.

Postumia, though innocent according to Livy, was suspected and tried for unchastity on grounds of her immodest attire and over-familiar manner. Some Vestals were acquitted. Some cleared themselves through ordeals or miraculous deeds; in a celebrated case during the mid-Republic, the Vestal Tuccia, accused of unchastity, carried water in a sieve to prove her innocence; Livy's epitomator (Per. 20) claims that she was condemned nevertheless but in all other sources she was acquitted.

House of the Vestals 

The House of the Vestals was the residence of the vestal priestesses in Rome.

Attire 

Vestal costume had elements in common with high-status Roman bridal dress, and with the formal dress of high status Roman matrons (married citizen-women). Vestals and matrons wore a long linen  over a white woolen , a rectangular female citizen's wrap, equivalent to the male citizen's semi-circular toga. A Vestal's hair was bound into a white, priestly  (head-covering or fillet) with red and white ribbons, usually tied together behind the head and hanging loosely over the shoulders.

The red ribbons of the Vestal  were said to represent Vesta's fire; and the white, virginity, or sexual purity. The stola is associated with Roman citizen-matrons and Vestals, not with brides. This covering of the body by way of the gown and veils "signals the prohibitions that governed [the Vestals] sexuality". The  communicates the message of "hands off" and asserts their virginity. The prescribed everyday hairstyle for Vestals, and for brides only on their wedding day, comprised six or seven braids; this was thought to date back to the most ancient of times. In 2013 Janet Stephens recreated the hairstyle of the vestals on a modern person.

Vestals wore a white, purple-bordered   (veil) when travelling outdoors, performing public rites or offering sacrifices. Respectable matrons were also expected to wear veils in public. One who appeared in public without her veil could be thought to have repudiated her marriage, making herself "available".

Lists of Vestals
From the institution of the Vestal priesthood to its abolition, an unknown number of Vestals held office. Some are named in Roman myth and history and some are of unknown date.

Earliest Vestals (Roman kingdom) 

The 1st-century BC author Varro, names the first four, probably legendary Vestals as Gegania, Veneneia, Canuleia, and Tarpeia. He and others also portray Tarpeia, daughter of Spurius Tarpeius in the Sabine-Roman war, as a treasonous Vestal Virgin. While her status as virgin is common to most accounts, her status as a vestal was likely the mythographer's invention, to cast her lust, greed and treason in the worst possible light.

Vestals in the Republic (509–27 BC) 

Orbinia, put to death for misconduct in 471.
Postumia, tried for misconduct in 420, but acquitted.
Minucia, put to death for misconduct in 337.
Sextilia, put to death for misconduct in 273.
Caparronia, committed suicide in 266 when accused of misconduct.
Floronia, Opimia, convicted of misconduct in 216, one was buried alive, the other committed suicide.
Claudia Ap. f. Ap. n., daughter of Appius Claudius Pulcher, consul in 143.  During the triumph of her father, she walked beside him to repulse a tribune of the plebs, who were trying to veto his triumph.
Fonteia, served , recorded as a Vestal during the trial of her brother in 69, but she would have begun her service before her father's death in 91.
Fabia, chief Vestal (born ;  50), admitted to the order in 80, half-sister of Terentia (Cicero's first wife), and full sister of Fabia the wife of Dolabella who later married her niece Tullia; she was probably mother of the later consul of that name. The case was prosecuted by Cicero.
Licinia ( 1st century) was supposedly courted by her kinsman, the so-called "triumvir" Marcus Licinius Crassus – who in fact wanted her property. This relationship gave rise to rumors. Plutarch says: "And yet when he was further on in years, he was accused of criminal intimacy with Licinia, one of the Vestal virgins and Licinia was formally prosecuted by a certain Plotius. Now Licinia was the owner of a pleasant villa in the suburbs which Crassus wished to get at a low price, and it was for this reason that he was forever hovering about the woman and paying his court to her, until he fell under the abominable suspicion. And in a way it was his avarice that absolved him from the charge of corrupting the Vestal, and he was acquitted by the judges. But he did not let Licinia go until he had acquired her property." Licinia became a Vestal in 85 and remained a Vestal until 61.
Arruntia, Perpennia M. f., Popillia, attended the inauguration of Lucius Cornelius Lentulus Niger as Flamen Martialis in 69.  Licinia, Crassus' relative, was also present.
Occia, vestal for 57 years between 38 BC  and 19 AD.

Imperial Vestals 
Junia Torquata (1st century), vestal under Tiberius, sister of Gaius Junius Silanus.
Rubria (1st century), said by Suetonius to have been raped by Nero.
Aquilia Severa (3rd century), whom Emperor Elagabalus married amid considerable scandal.
Clodia Laeta (3rd century).
Flavia Publicia (mid-3rd century).
Coelia Concordia (4th century), the last head of the order.

Outside Rome
Inscriptions record the existence of Vestals in other locations than the centre of Rome.
 Caecilia Philete, a senior virgin of Laurentum-Lavinium, as commemorated by her father, Q. Caecilius Papion. The title  means at Lavinium the Vestals were only two.
Saufeia Alexandria, .
Primigenia, Alban vestal of Bovillae, mentioned by Symmachus in two of his letters.

In Western art

The Vestals were used as models of female virtue in allegorizing portraiture of the later West. Elizabeth I of England was portrayed holding a sieve to evoke Tuccia, the Vestal who proved her virtue by carrying water in a sieve. Tuccia herself had been a subject for artists such as Jacopo del Sellaio ( 1493) and Joannes Stradanus, and women who were arts patrons started having themselves painted as Vestals. In the libertine environment of 18th century France, portraits of women as Vestals seem intended as fantasies of virtue infused with ironic eroticism. Later vestals became an image of republican virtue, as in Jacques-Louis David's The Vestal Virgin. The discovery of a "House of the Vestals" in Pompeii made the Vestals a popular subject in the 18th century and the 19th century.

Portraits as Vestals

Notes

References

Further reading
 Beard, Mary, "The Sexual Status of Vestal Virgins," The Journal of Roman Studies, Vol. 70, (1980), pp. 12–27.
Broughton, T. Robert S., The Magistrates of the Roman Republic, American Philological Association (1952–1986).
Kroppenberg, Inge, "Law, Religion and Constitution of the Vestal Virgins," Law and Literature, 22, 3, 2010, pp. 418 – 439. 
 Peck, Harry Thurston, Harpers Dictionary of Classical Antiquities (1898)
 Parker, Holt N. "Why Were the Vestals Virgins? Or the Chastity of Women and the Safety of the Roman State", American Journal of Philology, Vol. 125, No. 4. (2004), pp. 563–601.
 Samuel Ball Platner and Thomas Ashby, A Topographical Dictionary of Ancient Rome
 Saquete, José Carlos, "Las vírgenes vestales. Un sacerdocio femenino en la religión pública romana". Madrid: Consejo Superior de Investigaciones Científicas, 2000.
 Sawyer, Deborah F. "Magna Mater and the Vestal Virgins." In Women and Religion in the First Christian Centuries, 119–129. London: Routledge Press, 1996.
Staples, Ariadne, From Good Goddess to Vestal Virgins: Sex and Category in Roman Religion, Routledge, 1998
 Wildfang, Robin Lorsch. Rome's Vestal Virgins. Oxford: Routledge, 2006 (hardcover, ; paperback).
 Wyrwińska. (2021). The Vestal Virgins’ Socio-political Role and the Narrative of Roma Aeterna. Krakowskie Studia z Historii Państwa i Prawa, 14(2), 127–151. https://doi.org/10.4467/20844131KS.21.011.13519

External links

Rodolfo Lanciani (1898) "The Fall of a Vestal" Chapter 6, in Ancient Rome in the Light of Recent Discoveries.  Houghton, Mifflin and Company, Boston and New York, 1898.
article Vestales in Smith's Dictionary of Greek and Roman Antiquities
House of the Vestal Virgins

390s disestablishments in the Roman Empire
Ancient Roman religious titles
 
Gendered occupations
Vesta (mythology)
Virginity